Love Is a Racket (UK title: Such Things Happen) is a 1932 American pre-Code romantic comedy-drama film, starring Douglas Fairbanks, Jr. and Ann Dvorak. The movie was written by Courtney Terrett from the novel by Rian James, and directed by William A. Wellman.

Plot

Cast

References

External links 
 
 

1932 films
American black-and-white films
1930s crime comedy-drama films
1930s English-language films
Films based on American novels
1930s romantic comedy-drama films
Films directed by William A. Wellman
American romantic comedy-drama films
American crime comedy-drama films
Films about journalists
1932 comedy films
1932 drama films
1930s American films